Newfield Hall is a former country house located  to the southeast of the village of Airton, North Yorkshire, England. It is now a hotel.

History
It was designed by the Lancaster architect E. G. Paley for William Nicholson Alcock at a cost of £36,000.  Construction of the house started by at least 1855, and it was opened in 1856.    Alcock was a lawyer who had moved to Gloucestershire by 1881.

The house and its estate were sold in 1890 to William Illingworth, a retired Bradford worsted manufacturer.  It was sold again in 1901 to John William Morkill who became High Sheriff of Yorkshire in 1929–30 and a Deputy Lieutenant, and who wrote the standard local history of Malhamdale.  During the 1930s the estate was broken up, the house being leased to the Holiday Fellowship, and the rest of the estate was sold to All Souls College, Oxford.

The house has since been used as a hotel administered by HF Holidays.

See also

List of works by Sharpe and Paley

References

External links

Houses completed in 1856
Country houses in North Yorkshire
E. G. Paley buildings
Hotels in North Yorkshire
Country house hotels